Supremo is a 2012 Filipino biographical film directed by Richard V. Somes about the life of Katipunan Supremo (President) Andrés Bonifacio. The film stars Alfred Vargas as Bonifacio, alongside Mon Confiado, Hermie Concepcion, Nicco Manalo, Alex Vincent Medina, Nica Naval, and Manu Respall. The film premiered at SM City Fairview in Quezon City on November 30, 2012, Bonifacio's 149th birth anniversary, and went into general release on December 5. It was also entered into competition at the 14th Cinemanila International Film Festival.

Cast
Alfred Vargas as Andrés Bonifacio
Mon Confiado as Macario Sakay
Hermie Concepcion as Melchora "Tandang Sora" Aquino
Nicco Manalo as Emilio Jacinto
Alex Vincent Medina as Procopio Bonifacio
Nica Naval as Gregoria de Jesús
Manu Respall as Emilio Aguinaldo
Shielbert Manuel as Pio Valenzuela
Lehner Mendoza as Scarfaced
Jeff Fernandez as Genaro de los Reyes
Banjo Romero as Gaspar
Alex Cabodil as Magbanua

See also
Bonifacio: Ang Unang Pangulo (2014)

References

External links

2012 films
2012 biographical drama films
2010s historical drama films
Cultural depictions of Andrés Bonifacio
Cultural depictions of Emilio Aguinaldo
Philippine biographical films
Philippine historical drama films
2012 drama films